Mickey Bones is an American drummer and singer-songwriter. He has played with the Tarbox Ramblers, Bo Diddley, Morphine, The Breeders, Queen Ida, Michael Hurley, Catie Curtis, Bob Franke, Jimmy Ryan, Rick Danko, Bryan Lee, Van "Piano Man" Walls, Jill Sobule, Jim Kweskin, Birdsongs of the Mesozoic, and Steve Weber. Bones has also played in small side projects with David Lindley, Danny "Kootch" Kortchmar, and Wayne Bennett. He has led his own bands, the Boogaloo Swamis, Spitwhistle and the Hot Tamale Brass Band.

Bones has been featured with some of these musicians on record labels such as Atlantic, Shanachie, Flying Fish, Rounder, Hi-n-Dry, and Green Linnet.

Mickey Bones appeared in the movie Fever Pitch and Oliver Stone's film JFK. Bones played on the soundtrack of Fever Pitch with the Hot Tamale Brass Band, and collaborated with Mark Sandman for the soundtrack of the movie Just Your Luck.

References
Mickey Bones snare and bass drum solo
Twenty Dollar Gig – performed by George Thorogood – written by Mickey Bones
Former member of Tarbox Ramblers
Morphine – Sandbox – w/Mickey Bones
The Breeders – w/Mickey Bones
Michael Hurley – Sweetkorn – w/Mickey Bones
Bob Franke – Brief Histories – w/Mickey Bones
Jimmy Ryan – Wooden Leg – w/Mickey Bones
Jim Kweskin / Samoa Wilson – w/Mickey Bones
Birdsongs of the Mesozoic – Dancing On A'A – w/Mickey Bones
Danny "Kootch" Kortchmar – Trolling The Hootchy /and/ The Vineyard Sound Vol. 1 – w/Mickey Bones
"Fever Pitch" movie credits
Music department (drums) for the movie soundtrack of "Just Your Luck"

External links
Mickey Bones
All About Jazz: Article by music critic Brett Milano in the Boston Phoenix
 Hot Tamale Brass Band
Gudangmovies
Spitwhistle

American rock singers
American rock musicians
American folk musicians
American blues drummers
American jazz drummers
American folk singers
American singer-songwriters
American rock songwriters
American male singer-songwriters
Year of birth missing (living people)
Living people
American male jazz musicians